Fatalis, Latin for "deadly", may refer to:

Smilodon fatalis ("the deadly Smilodon"), a saber-toothed cat

in Popular Culture
Arc Fatalis, a black metal band from the United States

in Video Games

Fatalis is one of the dragons that appear in the Monster Hunter video game franchise.
Liberi Fatali is the Latin choral opening to the computer role-playing game Final Fantasy VIII
Arx Fatalis, an RPG for the Xbox and PC, released in 2002 by Arkane Studios